The men's tunggal (single) seni competition at the 2018 Asian Games took place from 25 to 29 August 2018 at Padepokan Pencak Silat, Taman Mini Indonesia Indah, Jakarta, Indonesia.

Schedule
All times are Western Indonesia Time (UTC+07:00)

Results
Legend
DSQ — Disqualified

Preliminary

Group A

Group B

Final

References

External links
Official website

Men's tunggal